Čekiškė  is a small town in Kaunas County in central Lithuania, it is located about  north-west of Kaunas city municipality. In 2011, it had a population of 682. The main town square formed where three roads converged. This dictated a radial plan for the town, which is now protected as a monument of urban architecture.

History 
On 22nd of July 1887 the fire in Čekiškė destroyed majority of the infrastructure with only 3 buildings remaining. Majority of the population at the time were Jewish families. After fire the Synagogue of Čekiškė was rebuilt and remained unchanged to this day, although not in use anymore.

References

External links
Čekiškės seniūnija (Čekiškė eldership) website

 
Towns in Lithuania
Towns in Kaunas County